Hunt is a 2022 South Korean espionage action film directed by Lee Jung-jae in his feature directorial debut, starring Lee and Jung Woo-sung. It was invited to the non-competitive Midnight Screening section at the 2022 Cannes Film Festival. It was released theatrically on August 10, 2022 in South Korea.
	
The film became the fourth highest-grossing Korean film of 2022 with 4,352,390 admissions and $36,114,055 gross.

Historical background 
The film deals with three major historical events in the 1980s; the May 18 Gwangju Democratization Movement (1980), the defection of North Korean pilot Lee Ung-pyeong (1983), and the Aung San terrorist attack (1983).

Plot 
In the 1980s, when the military dictatorship reached its peak, KCIA Foreign Unit chief Park Pyong-ho (Lee Jung-jae) and Domestic Unit chief Kim Jung-do (Jung Woo-sung) are working together in Washington D.C., protecting the president. While they are on patrol, the CIA notices enemy kill team and informs the Korean team about it. Park and Kim catch and kills them. After the incident in Washington, the director of KCIA tells Park and Kim that there is a North Korean mole within the company, known as Donglim. According to intel from the CIA, he is a dangerous spy of North Korea who tries to assassinate the president of the South. Kim and Park work to root out Donglim. At the same time they work on an exfiltration of an asylum seeking North Korean nuclear physicist in Japan. Park's team leads the operation of the physicist, but it ends in failure. Afterwards, the two teams begin to pursue Donglim in their own way. After a long investigation, they uncover the truth about each other. Kim and his followers plan to assassinate the South Korean President because they feel he needs to face justice for the Gwangju Democratic Movement, which resulted in the massacre of innocent civilians. In a twist Park is revealed to be the Donglim. Park escapes Kim's pursing agents and meets his handler to receive his orders. He is shocked to discover that his operation parameters have changed and that he will be killed once the operation is completed. Kim saves Park from his handlers and hides his identity from the KCIA and brings him into the plan to assassinate the South Korean President in Bangkok, Thailand. North Korean snipers and Kim attack the Presidential motorcade but are stopped by Park. Meanwhile, a planted North Korean agent detonates a bomb as a last resort; however, it fails to kill the President who manages to escape the explosion. Kim is caught up in the explosion and dies. After the incident in Thailand, Park visits Kim's family to deliver a tribute, then goes south to prepare an escape to America. However, as he drives along the coast, North Korean agents appear and assassinate him.

Cast 
 Lee Jung-jae as Park Pyong-ho
 KCIA Foreign Unit Chief who has been working for the agency for 13 years, and is a highly respected agent.
 Jung Woo-sung as Kim Jung-do
 KCIA Domestic Unit Chief who is a former military officer.
 Jeon Hye-jin as Bang Joo-kyung
 KCIA Foreign Unit's ace agent who works alongside Park Pyong-ho.
 Heo Sung-tae as Jang Cheol-seong
 KCIA Domestic Unit agent and a loyal subordinate of Kim Jung-do.
 Go Youn-jung as Jo Yoo-jeong
 A college student who has been under Park Pyong-ho's protection and guidance.
 Kim Jong-soo as Director Ahn
 Newly appointed KCIA director and a former military officer.
 Jung Man-sik as Agent Yang
  An ambitious agent of Park Pyong-ho’s Foreign Unit.
 Kang Kyung-heon as Kim Jeong-do's wife

Special appearance
 Park Sung-woong as Tokyo branch agent 1
 Jo Woo-jin as Tokyo branch agent 2
 Kim Nam-gil as Tokyo branch agent 3
 Ju Ji-hoon as Tokyo branch agent 4
 Hwang Jung-min as Lieutenant Lee
 Lee Sung-min as Cho Won-sik
 Yoo Jae-myung as CEO Choi

Production

Development 
The film was first known as a movie titled Namsan in which Lee Jung-jae decided to take the lead role in 2017 and had to cancel the production before filming due to various circumstances. Then Lee himself refined its script and prepared for 4 years. In addition to directing, starring and contributing to the screenplay, he also co-produced the film.

Filming 
Filming began on May 8, 2021 and concluded on November 13, 2021.

Post production (re-editing for international release) 
On August 3, 2022, Lee revealed that he re-edited the film after Cannes screening and the new version will be screened at Toronto International Film Festival for its North American premier. However the original will be used for the theatrical release in South Korea.

To help global audiences get a better understanding of the political era depicted in the film, Lee revised several key lines and scenes which made some actors re-record the dialogues. Explaining, Lee stated, “When writing the script of 'Hunt,' I set younger generations in South Korea who learn about the era from history textbooks as the target audience. I thought foreign viewers would be the same,... But at Cannes, about 30% of foreign media reviews complained that it was hard for them to keep up with the story, as they didn’t know about Korean politics in the 1980s.”

Release 
The film premiered at the 75th Cannes Film Festival on May 19, 2022 at the Lumière Theater, where it received a seven-minute standing ovation. It was released in theaters on August 10, 2022 by Megabox. The film's distribution rights were pre-sold to 207 territories. The film was invited to 2022 Toronto International Film Festival and was screened at the Gala Presentations section in September 2022. Magnolia Pictures acquired the distribution rights for a U.S. theatrical release in December of 2022.

The film was scheduled to be available for streaming on Netflix from December 7, 2022, but has not been made available yet.

Reception

Critical response
On Metacritic, the film has a weighted average score of 52 out of 100, based on 11 critics, indicating "mixed or average reviews".

International
Pete Hammond in his review for Deadline praised the direction, cinematography and performance of main and supporting cast. Peter Debruge writing for Variety described Hunt as a "long but lightning-paced film with a jolt of adrenaline" and appreciated Lee's direction and acting. Lou Thomas of BFI wrote that the film is packed with "thrillingly violent action scenes and jaw-dropping shocks" but "Lee occasionally forgets to keep things comprehensible or believable" and called the movie fun to watch. David Rooney writing for The Hollywood Reporter stated that the film lacks character depth and storytelling coherence and called it "an increasingly frustrating movie that loses its way amid a dense thicket of plot complications, double-dealings, counterplans and surprise revelations." David Ehrlich of IndieWire graded the film as C, described it as "hopelessly convoluted espionage thriller that doesn’t tell a story" and stated "Lee’s debut is little more than a chattering Pez dispenser full of plot twists." In his review for South China Morning Post, Clarence Tsui wrote that the film is "excessively bombastic and muddled" except for history junkies and hardcore action-movie fans, called the storyline messy and confusing for audiences who are unfamiliar with the historical setting of the film, and gave 2 stars out of 5.

South Korean
Kim Seon-woo reviewing for JTBC praised the film's great visuals, detailed mise-en-scène, and spectacular action scenes and added that the large and small reversals in the plot maintain the tension of the film until the very end. Ryu Ji-yoon writing for Dailian praised the portrayal of Park Pyeong-do and Kim Jeong-do, who have the same goal but different methods, being densely designed to fill the cinematic imagination and fun and added, "It is not difficult to understand historical events without prior knowledge, but the more you know, the more you see." Choi Young-joo of No Cut News stated, "although it is called an espionage action genre, it is regrettable that the center of gravity is focused on the rushing 'action' rather than 'espionage' that goes back and forth in suspicion" but praised the film's sounds, sets and props that made the audience feel the atmosphere of the 1980s and the direction of Lee who reached his goal with a formidable theme and content. Song Kyung-won of Cine21 outlined the film as "a film that takes a motif from a true story, but makes the most of the historical imagination, and is essentially focused on action rather than espionage" and concluded, "Despite some expediency that fills in the holes in the narrative, it is a decent debut that blends historical imagination and commercial achievements."

Box office
The film was released on 1548 screens on August 11, 2022 in South Korea. The opening recorded 210,000 admissions and topped the South Korean box office. The film surpassed 1 million admissions in 4 days of release and 2 million admissions in 7 days of release. On the 12th day, Hunt became the third South Korean film in 2022 to cross 3 million admissions. On the 25th day, it surpassed 4 million admissions.

, it is the 4th highest-grossing Korean film of 2022 with gross of US$33,814,228 and 4,352,407 admissions.

Accolades

References

External links
 
 
 
 
 
 

2022 films
2020s South Korean films
2020s Korean-language films
South Korean spy films
South Korean action films
2022 directorial debut films
Films set in 1983
Films about the National Intelligence Service (South Korea)
2022 action films